Giovanni Francesco "Gianni" Rodari (23 October 1920 – 14 April 1980) was an Italian writer and journalist, most famous for his works of children's literature, notably Il romanzo di Cipollino. For his lasting contribution as a children's author he received the biennial Hans Christian Andersen Medal in 1970. He is considered as Italy's most important 20th-century children's author and his books have been translated into many languages, though few have been published in English.

Biography
Rodari was born in Omegna, a small town on Lake Orta in the province of Novara in northern Italy. His father, a baker, died when Rodari was only eight. Rodari and his two brothers, Cesare and Mario (who was younger than him), were raised by his mother in her native village, in the province of Varese. After three years at the seminary in Seveso, Rodari received his teacher's diploma at the age of seventeen and began to teach elementary classes in rural schools of the Varese district. He had interest in music (three years of violin lessons) and literature (discovered the works of Nietzsche, Schopenhauer, Lenin and Trotsky which sharpened his critical sense). In 1939, for a short time, Rodari attended the Catholic University of Milan.

During World War II, Rodari had a deferment from the army due to his ill health. Due to his precarious financial situation, he applied for work at the Casa del Fascio and was forced to join the National Fascist Party. Traumatized by the loss of his two best friends and his favorite brother Cesare's incarceration in a German concentration camp, Rodari joined the Italian Communist Party in 1944 and participated in the Italian resistance movement.

In 1948, as a journalist for the Communist periodical L'Unità, he began writing books for children. In 1950, the Party installed him as editor of the new weekly children's magazine Il Pioniere in Rome. In 1951, Rodari published his first books, Il Libro delle Filastrocche and Il Romanzo di Cipollino.

In 1952, he traveled for the first time to the Soviet Union, which he frequented thereafter. In 1953, he married Maria Teresa Feretti, who four years later gave birth to their daughter, Paola. In 1957, Rodari passed the exam to become a professional journalist.

Rodari spent the years 1966–1969 working intensively on collaborative projects with children. In 1970 he received the Hans Christian Andersen Medal for children's literature, which gained him a wide international reputation as the best modern children's writer in Italian. The biennial award by the International Board on Books for Young People is the highest recognition available to a writer or illustrator of children's books. His works have been translated into numerous languages.

In 1979, after another trip to the Soviet Union, his health, never very robust, declined and his productivity diminished. He died in Rome, following a surgical operation, in April 1980.

Works

He is perhaps best known for developing the story of Cipollino.  The story of Cipollino was popular enough to have a ballet staged in the Soviet Union in 1973, composed by Karen Khachaturian and choreographed by Genrik Alexandrovich Maiorov. Cipollino, or Little Onion, fights the unjust treatment of his fellow vegetable townfolk by the fruit royalty (Prince Lemon and the overly proud Tomato) in the garden kingdom. The main theme is the "struggle of the underclass and the powerful, good versus evil" and the importance of friendship in the face of difficulties. Rodari's works have continued to be published and re-illustrated by other authors after his death, including Nicoletta Costa.

 Il libro delle filastrocche (“The Book of Children's Poems”, 1950)
 Il romanzo di Cipollino (“The Adventures of Cipollino, the Little Onion”, 1951)
 Gelsomino nel paese dei bugiardi (“Gelsomino in the Country of Liars”, 1958)
 Filastrocche in cielo e in terra (“Nursery Rhymes in the Sky and on Earth”, 1960)
 Favole al telefono (“Telephone Tales”, 1962)
 Gip nel televisore (“Gip in the Television”, 1962)
 La freccia azzurra (“The Blue Arrow”, 1964)
 La torta in cielo (“The Cake in the Sky”, 1966)
 La grammatica della fantasia (“The Grammar of Fantasy”, 1974)
 C'era due volte il barone Lamberto ovvero I misteri dell'isola di San Giulio (Twice Upon a Time there was a Baron called Lamberto or The Mysteries of the Isle of San Giulio, 1978)
 Novelle fatte a macchina (“Stories written on a typewriter”)
 Atalanta
 Piccoli Vagabondi

Tribute
On 23 October 2020 Google celebrated his 100th birthday with a Google Doodle.

See also

2703 Rodari

References

Further reading
 Argilli, Marcello, del Cornò, Lucio, and de Luca, Carmine (eds.), Le provocazioni della fantasia. Gianni Rodari scrittore e educatore (1993).
 Bini, G. (ed.), Leggere Rodari (1981).
 Boero, Pino, Una storia, tante storie: guida all'opera di Gianni Rodari (1992)
 Cambi, Franco, Collodi, De Amicis, Rodari : tre immagini d'infanzia. Dedalo, 1985.   
 Gianni Rodari : la letteratura per l’infanzia, a cura di Enzo Catarsi. Pisa: Edizioni del Cerro, 2002
 Petrini, Enzo, Argilli, Marcello, and Bonardi, Carlo (eds.), Gianni Rodari Giunti-Marzocco, 1981.
 Rodari, Gianni, The Grammar of Fantasy, trans. with intro. Jack Zipes (1996).
 Se la fantasia cavalca con la ragione : prolungamenti degli itinerari suggeriti dall'opera di Gianni Rodari : convegno nel decennale della Grammatica della fantasia, organizzato da Comune e Provincia di Reggio Emilia, Regione Emilia Romagna, ARCI, Reggio Emilia, 10-12 novembre 1982 ; a cura di Carmine de Luca. Bergamo: Juvenilia, c1983
 Zagni, Patrizia, Gianni Rodari. Firenze: La Nuova Italia, 1975

External links
 
 A Rodari short story, Polenta Fritta, translated into English 
 Rodari-Website (Italian)
 Rodari-Biography (Italian)
 a Russian Chippolino cartoon
answers.com
 The Cafe Irreal: "Trolley Number 75" by Gianni Rodari (English translation)

1920 births
1980 deaths
Hans Christian Andersen Award for Writing winners
Italian children's writers
Italian science fiction writers
Italian male journalists
Italian anti-fascists
Italian resistance movement members
Italian Communist Party politicians
20th-century Italian journalists
20th-century Italian politicians
Italian Marxist journalists
Italian Marxist writers
People from Omegna
20th-century Italian novelists
Italian male novelists